Nordegren is a Swedish surname and it may refer to:

 Elin Nordegren, Swedish model and ex-wife of professional golfer Tiger Woods
 Thomas Nordegren, Swedish journalist and writer

See also
Nordgren